Long Grove may refer to a place in the United States:

 Long Grove, Illinois
 Long Grove, Iowa